The Sheriff of Skye was historically the royal official responsible for enforcing law and order in Skye, Scotland and bringing criminals to justice. The sheriffdom was created in 1293 by King John of Scotland in an effort to maintain peace in the western reaches of his realm.

Sheriffs of Skye 

William II, Earl of Ross 1293-??

Citations and References
Citations

Reference

Sheriff courts
Isle of Skye
Inner Hebrides
1293 establishments in Scotland